Henry Edson "Eddie" Matteson (September 7, 1884 to September 1, 1943), was a Major League Baseball pitcher who played with the Philadelphia Phillies in  and the Washington Senators in . He batted and threw right-handed.

He was born in Guys Mills, Pennsylvania and died in Westfield, New York.

External links

1884 births
1943 deaths
Major League Baseball pitchers
Baseball players from Pennsylvania
Philadelphia Phillies players
Washington Senators (1901–1960) players
Troy Trojans (minor league) players
Ridgway (minor league baseball) players
Elmira Colonels players
Dallas Giants players
Dallas Marines players
New Orleans Pelicans (baseball) players
Salt Lake City Bees players
Houston Buffaloes players
Nashville Vols players
Beaumont Exporters players
Reading Keystones players
Newark Bears (IL) players
Providence Grays (minor league) players
Scranton Miners players
York White Roses players